Karin Svensson Smith (born 11 August 1956 in Kävlinge, Skåne County) is a Swedish politician of the Green Party, and formerly of the Left Party. She has been a member of the Riksdag since 1998. From 1998 to 2005, she represented the Left Party, after which she left the party but not her seat in the Riksdag, and joined the Green Party. From 2005 to 2006 she was therefore formally an unaffiliated member of the Riksdag. In the 2006 election she was elected to the Riksdag for her new party for the election circuit Malmö. In the election 2010 she in a candidate for the same circuit.

In 2006 she wrote [SOU 2006:72 Öppna möjligheter med alkolås.]

External links
Karin Svensson Smith at the Riksdag website
http://www.regeringen.se/sb/d/108/a/66420

1956 births
21st-century Swedish women politicians
Living people
Members of the Riksdag 1998–2002
Members of the Riksdag 2002–2006
Members of the Riksdag 2006–2010
Members of the Riksdag 2014–2018
Members of the Riksdag from the Green Party
Members of the Riksdag from the Left Party (Sweden)
People from Kävlinge Municipality
Women members of the Riksdag